Soft Beds, Hard Battles is a 1974 British comedy film directed by Roy Boulting, starring Peter Sellers (in several roles), Curt Jurgens, Lila Kedrova and Jenny Hanley. Sellers reunited with the Boulting brothers for this farce, in which the women of a brothel help the war effort to rid the world of the Nazi peril - in the bedroom.

The film took a limited release; in the United States, it was released under the title Undercovers Hero.

Plot
Set in Nazi-occupied France, the story follows Major Robinson of the British Army. Installing himself at a Parisian brothel, he assists the French resistance and works with Madame Grenier and her girls who find themselves eliminating high ranking German officers (using ingenious rigged beds and killer flatulence pills) right under the noses of the Gestapo. The girls find themselves enlisted in the Free French Forces and finally help to foil Hitler's plan to blow up Paris. They later receive medals from the French president.

Cast
Peter Sellers as General Latour/Major Robinson/Herr Schroeder/Adolf Hitler/President of France/Prince Kyoto/Narrator
Lila Kedrova as Madame Grenier
Curd Jürgens as General von Grotjahn
Béatrice Romand as Marie-Claude
Jenny Hanley as Michelle
Gabriella Licudi as Simone
Françoise Pascal as Madeleine
Rex Stallings as Alan Cassidy
Rula Lenska as Louise
Daphne Lawson as Claudine
Hylette Adolphe as Tom-tom
Vernon Dobtcheff as Padre
Douglas Sheldon as Kapitan Kneff
Thorley Walters as General Erhardt
Timothy West as Chaplain
Jean Charles Driant as Jean
Philip Madoc as Field Marshal Weber
Patricia Burke as Mother Superior
Basil Dignam as Brigadier
Nicholas Loukes as Schultz
Stanley Lebor as 1st Gestapo agent
Gertan Klauber as 2nd Gestapo agent
Barry J. Gordon as 3rd Gestapo agent
Joan Baxter as Vera Lynn
Carolle Rousseau as Hélène
Windsor Davies as Bisset
Nicholas Courtney as French Intelligence Officer (uncredited)

Production
John and Roy Boulting had been pursuing separate careers for several years before reuniting to make this film. John left his position as managing director of British Lion which he held for six years to produce "because I am anxious to make films again." He called the film "a flippant look at war and the absurdities of war... All naked men are alike really and the film stresses the idea that wars are not won or lost by top level Whitehall, Pentagon, or Wilhemstrasse strategy but by fortuitous intangibles and by the foibles of human beings."

The brothers were directors of British Lion, which was sold to Barclay Securities. They proposed to sell 45 of the 60 acres of Shepperton studio for housing development. The union protested and said if any of the previous directors of Shepperton, such as the Boultings, tried to make films anywhere they would be blackbanned. Production on the film began in March 1973 but was halted due to uncertainty about the banning. John Boulting blamed "a little cabal of Communists who are ideologically motivated. They are dedicated in my view not to the improvement of our industry but to the destruction of the whole fabric of society." The union said the Boultings were "hysterical." The union withdrew the blackban provided the Boultings give "prior consideration" to Shepperton for the making of any other films. The brothers agreed. Filming finished by May 1973.

Reception
The film was a financial failure and Roy Boulting lost a good deal of his own money on it.

The Irish Times called it "his best film for some time". Vincent Canby The New York Times called it "a sketch film with very few jokes". Time Out wrote: "Its raison d'être is Peter Sellers, back in brilliant form as six variations on blinkered authority, including Hitler and a De Gaulle-ish French general, but particularly as the Gestapo chief Schroeder, limping-cum-strutting from disaster to disaster, an extraordinary amalgam of Dr Strangelove and Fred Kite. Worth a visit for Sellers and one classic joke about a PoW."

References

External links

Soft Beds, Had Battles at BFI

1974 films
1974 comedy films
British comedy films
1970s English-language films
Films about prostitution in Paris
Films about the French Resistance
Films directed by Roy Boulting
Films set in France
Films set in the 1940s
Military humor in film
British World War II films
1970s British films